Macedonius of Thessalonica or Macedonius Consul (c.500-560 AD) a Byzantine hypatos during the reign of Justinian, is the author of 42 epigrams in the Greek Anthology, the best of which are some delicate and fanciful amatory pieces. His poems were published in 567 AD by Agathias in his collection of contemporary epigrams, the "Kyklos".

References
Ancient Library
About.com

External links
Select Epigrams from the Greek Anthology -Google
Macedonius Consul: The Epigrams -Amazon 

Byzantine poets
Ancient Macedonian poets
6th-century Greek poets
6th-century Byzantine people
Epigrammatists of the Greek Anthology
Year of birth uncertain
560 deaths
6th-century Byzantine writers